Sasha Meneghel Szafir Figueiredo (born 28 July 1998) is a Brazilian model.

Biography 
Meneghel was born in Rio de Janeiro. She is the only child of TV host, singer and businesswoman Xuxa Meneghel and Luciano Szafir.

She grew up in the spotlight, having her first minutes of life displayed by Rede Globo's prime time news program Jornal Nacional. Her birth became the most documented in the history of Brazil, according to magazine Veja.

Meneghel appeared in programs presented by her mother including Xuxa só para Baixinhos. In 2009 she starred in her first feature film in Xuxa em O Mistério de Feiurinha, directed by Tizuka Yamasaki.

Meneghel was a volleyball player for the team of Clube de Regatas do Flamengo. In 2011, she was invited by CBV (Brazilian Volleyball Confederation) for a period of training with the Brazilian national team Sub-19.

Personal life
In 2016, Meneghel finished high school at the American School of Rio de Janeiro, and then moved to New York and began studying at the Parsons School of Design.

Filmography

Film

Television

References

External links 
 

1998 births
Living people
People from Rio de Janeiro (city)
Brazilian people of Italian descent
Brazilian people of Jewish descent
Brazilian people of Lebanese descent
Brazilian people of Portuguese descent
Brazilian people of Polish descent
Brazilian people of German descent
Brazilian people of Swiss descent
Brazilian female models
Brazilian film actresses
Brazilian women's volleyball players
Parsons School of Design alumni